Lucar or Lúcar is a surname, and may refer to:

 Cyprian Lucar (1544–1611), English mechanician and author
 Elizabeth Lucar (1510–1537), English calligrapher
 Jorge Lucar (born 1934), Chilean Army general
 Nicolás Lúcar, Peruvian journalist

See also
Lucar, automobile marque
Lúcar, Spain